Sarah Elizabeth Atherton (born 15 November 1967) is a British Conservative Party politician, who has served as the Member of Parliament (MP) for Wrexham since the 2019 general election. She served as  Parliamentary Under-Secretary of State for Defence People, Veterans and Service Families from September to October 2022.

She is the first Conservative to represent the Wrexham constituency since its creation in 1918. In addition, Atherton is the first female MP elected to represent the seat, and became the first female Conservative MP elected to Westminster representing a Welsh constituency.

Early life and career 
Atherton was born in Chester in 1967, the daughter of John Atherton from Chester and Evelyn Atherton (née Morgan / Stringer) from Caernarfon. She left Christleton High School in Chester, a local comprehensive school, at the age of 16.

Atherton joined the army, serving in the Intelligence Corps, before training at Bangor University and becoming a Registered General Nurse. She also studied at Manchester Metropolitan University, receiving a BSc (Hons) in Community Health (Specialist District Nurse), and at the University of Liverpool, where she obtained a Masters in Social Work.

Atherton has worked as a nurse, district nurse and social worker. In addition, she ran her own business, a micro brewery, based on Wrexham Industrial Estate. Prior to being elected as the Member of Parliament for Wrexham, she served on Gresford Community Council. She is a member of the Royal British Legion.

Parliamentary career 
Atherton was elected as the Member of Parliament for Wrexham in 2019. Wrexham was the first seat to be gained from Labour's "red wall" in North Wales. The BBC described her at the time as "a passionate Brexiteer."

Atherton supports travel discounts for some people who have formerly worked in the British Armed Forces and have been injured. In the House of Commons, she sits on the Defence Select Committee. Atherton is a member of the Armed Forces and Beer All-Party Parliamentary Groups.

In February 2020, Atherton was appointed as the Parliamentary Private Secretary to the Secretary of State for Wales, Simon Hart. In June 2020, she supported discussions about sexual abuse in the armed forces being prosecuted in civilian courts rather than military courts.

The same month, it was reported during the coronavirus outbreak that Atherton limited her engagement on the platform Twitter to only her followers, with some Twitter contributors criticising her for a lack of communication. Atherton has been criticised for promoting the re-opening of a McDonald's outlet in Wrexham on her Twitter account, citing childhood obesity and small independent businesses which require help. Whilst it is a locally owned franchise, licence fees are paid to McDonald's UK subsidiary.

In August 2020, Atherton suggested in a Twitter post that the army should be deployed to stop migrants crossing the English Channel. Her tweet was criticised by immigration law specialists, and Atherton was described as displaying a "staggering level of ignorance" by the director of Stand for All, a human rights advocacy group. In response, Atherton said: "I frequently assist people in Wrexham seeking asylum. However what we are seeing in the Channel is little more than exploitation of vulnerable people by human traffickers and gang leaders." She described it as "an abuse of the system, which is blocking the way for those in genuine need of asylum."

Voting record
In January 2020, Atherton voted, with the majority of MPs, against an Opposition amendment, "Proportional Representation to Elect MPs in the House of Commons", on the subject of electoral reform and PR.

In February 2020, Atherton voted with the majority of MPs against an Opposition motion on "proper funding of public services along with robust action against tax avoidance and evasion". In the same month she voted with the majority of MPs against an Opposition motion on "a plan to eliminate a substantial majority of transport emissions by 2030".

In July 2020, Atherton voted with the majority of MPs against a Green Party amendment to the Trade Bill, which the proposer said "would aim to protect the NHS and publicly funded health and care services in other parts of the UK from any form of control from outside the UK". Quoted after the vote, Atherton said: "I will continue to respect the manifesto upon which I was elected, which clearly stated that 'when we are negotiating trade deals, the NHS will not be on the table. The price the NHS pays for drugs will not be on the table. The services the NHS provides will not be on the table'."

Personal life 
In 2014, Atherton married Nicholas John Daniel Corcoran. She has a son. Her recreations are listed in Who's Who as "lover of real ale, sailing, ski-ing, family, countryside, passionate about Wales".

References

External links

1967 births
Living people
UK MPs 2019–present
21st-century British women politicians
Conservative Party (UK) MPs for Welsh constituencies
Female members of the Parliament of the United Kingdom for Welsh constituencies
Intelligence Corps soldiers
Alumni of Bangor University
English nurses